Food Detectives was a food science show hosted by Ted Allen that aired in North America on Food Network from July to September 2008. Ted Allen, backed by research conducted by Popular Science magazine, investigated food-related beliefs, such as the validity of the five-second rule or the effectiveness of ginger in relieving motion sickness. In addition to support from scientists such as molecular biologist Dr. Adam Ruben and Popular Science staff members, Allen was assisted on-screen by a group of "food techs," often-silent assistants who were the participants in simple experiments exploring food-related myths, beliefs, practices, and folkways.

See also
Brainiac: Science Abuse
Good Eats
MythBusters

References

External links
Food Network: Food Detectives with Ted Allen
 

Food Network original programming
2008 American television series debuts